The discography of the British band Genesis contains 15 studio albums, 6 live albums, 4 compilation albums, and 10 box sets. They have sold over 100 million albums worldwide, including around 21.5 million RIAA-certified albums in the United States

Genesis were formed by lead singer Peter Gabriel, keyboardist Tony Banks, bassist / guitarist Mike Rutherford, guitarist Anthony Phillips and drummer Chris Stewart at the British public school Charterhouse School, where they drew on contemporary pop, soul, classical and church music influences to write their own songs. They attracted the interest of former pupil Jonathan King, who signed them to a contract in 1967. Following the failure of the first few singles, and an album, From Genesis to Revelation, the group split from King in 1969, signing with Charisma Records the following year. From then to 1974, Genesis released a studio album around once a year. After several line-up changes, the band stabilised in 1971 after drummer Phil Collins and guitarist Steve Hackett joined Gabriel, Banks and Rutherford. The group established commercial success in the UK with Foxtrot (1972), and with the following year's Selling England by the Pound charting at No. 3.

The group survived Gabriel's departure in 1975, with Collins taking over as lead singer, releasing the top three album A Trick of the Tail the following year. Hackett left in 1977, reducing the group to a trio of Banks, Rutherford and Collins. They became more commercially successful in the 1980s and began to have hit singles, reaching a peak with 1986's Invisible Touch and 1991's We Can't Dance which both topped the UK charts. After Collins left the band in 1996, the group released one more album, Calling All Stations, before disbanding.  They have since reformed for several tours and live albums, most recently in 2021-2022.

All of the group's work since signing to Charisma (since acquired by Virgin Records and then EMI) has been remastered and re-released, and is available on various compilations albums such as Rock Theatre, Turn It On Again: The Hits and Platinum Collection. The sole exception is pre-Charisma album From Genesis to Revelation, whose copyright is owned by King, which has been reissued several times independently of the rest of the band's releases.

Albums

Studio albums

Live albums

Compilation albums

Box sets

EPs

Singles

1960s

1970s

1980s

1990s

2000s

Other charted songs

Videos

Video albums

Music videos

Notes

References
Citations

Sources

 
 
 
 

Genesis (band)
Discographies of British artists
Rock music group discographies